The following is the current leaderboard for career hits in KBO League Korean baseball.

Players with 1,700 or more hits

 Stats updated as of October 12, 2022.

References

See also
 List of KBO career home run leaders
 List of KBO career RBI leaders
 List of KBO career saves leaders
 List of KBO career stolen bases leaders
 List of Major League Baseball career hits leaders
 List of Nippon Professional Baseball career hits leaders

Korean baseball articles